The Samur is a river in Russia's Dagestan Republic, also partially flowing through
Azerbaijan and forming part of the Azerbaijan–Russia border.

Overview
The Samur river originates in glaciers and mountain springs of the Greater Caucasus mountains. The elevated and midsections of the river from through the territory of Russia, lower sections flow through Azerbaijan making up the Russian-Azerbaijani border. After joining its other tributary Usuxçay River, the width of the river grows.
Once the river is in the open Caspian basin, it splits some of its parts into Tahirçay and Uğar  rivers on Azerbaijani territory. The river mainly feeds on rain and underground waters with its volume broken up as follows: 42% from rain, 32% from underground waters, 22% from snow, 4% from glaciers. The river supplies irrigation water to the Samur-Absheron channel, which follows south to Jeyranbatan reservoir.

See also

Rivers and lakes in Dagestan
Rivers and lakes in Azerbaijan

References

External links

Rivers of Dagestan
Rivers of Azerbaijan
Tributaries of the Caspian Sea
Azerbaijan–Russia border
International rivers of Asia
Border rivers